The 1973 Northwestern Red Raiders football team was an American football team that represented Northwestern College of Orange City, Iowa s a member of the Tri-State Conference during the 1973 NAIA Division II football season a. Led by Larry Korver in his seventh season as head coach, the team compiled a perfect record of 12–0, winning the Tri-State Conference title with a 5–0 mark and the NAIA Division II Football National Championship with a 10–3 victory  in the championship game.

Schedule

References

Westmar
Northwestern Red Raiders football seasons
NAIA Football National Champions
Tri-State Conference (1960–1981) football champion seasons
College football undefeated seasons
Northwestern Red Raiders football